D. S. Tavern, also known as the 1740 House, is a historic tavern located at Ivy, Albemarle County, Virginia. The building dates to the late-18th to early-19th century.  It is a two-story, single pile, log and frame I-house, covered in beaded weatherboards.  It sits on a brick and rubblestone foundation and has a gable roof pierced by two brick chimneys.  It has an early-19th century, one-story kitchen connected by a hyphen. From 1785 to about 1850, the tavern served the westward movement of settlers along the turnpike running from Richmond to the Valley. The tavern was owned by Chief Justice John Marshall who maintained the property from 1810–1813.  In the mid- to late 19th century, it was converted to a private residence.

It was added to the National Register of Historic Places in 1983.

References

External links
 D. S. Tavern, U.S. Route 250 West, Charlottesville, Charlottesville, VA at the Historic American Buildings Survey (HABS)

Taverns in Virginia
Drinking establishments on the National Register of Historic Places in Virginia
Buildings and structures in Albemarle County, Virginia
National Register of Historic Places in Albemarle County, Virginia
Historic American Buildings Survey in Virginia